Lewes is a surname, and may refer to:

 Charles Lee Lewes, British actor
 George Henry Lewes (1817–1878), British philosopher and literary critic 
 Jock Lewes, Australian soldier

See also

 Lewes
 Lewes (disambiguation)